Ana Arneodo (1898 – 1977) was an Argentine actress of the 1940s and 1950s.

Arneodo made her appearance in film in 1939 and made some 24 appearances between then and 1958,  appearing in films such as the 1942 film Adolescencia alongside Pola Alonso and Al marido hay que seguirlo (1948). She regularly worked under the films of director Francisco Múgica.

She retired in 1958.

Films

1939 El solterón
1940  A Thief Has Arrived
1940 Nosotros, los muchachos
1940 Un señor mucamo
1941 Los martes, orquídeas
1941 Una vez en la vida
1942 Adolescencia
1942 Cada hogar un mundo
1942 Su primer baile
1942 El viaje (1942 film)
1943 Todo un hombre
1943 El espejo
1943 An Evening of Love 
1944 Se rematan ilusiones
1945 Se abre el abismo
1948 Al marido hay que seguirlo
1948 La gran tentación
1949 La cuna vacía
1950 The New Bell 
1950 Surcos de sangre
1953 Fin de mes
1954 Barrio Gris
1956 Oro bajo
1958 Las apariencias engañan

External links
 

1898 births
1977 deaths
Argentine film actresses
Place of birth missing